The Lisle-Shields Town House is a historic house in Natchez, Mississippi, USA. It built from 1860 to 1864. It has been listed on the National Register of Historic Places since March 29, 1979.

References

Houses on the National Register of Historic Places in Mississippi
Greek Revival houses in Mississippi
Houses completed in 1864
Houses in Adams County, Mississippi